Tayo Walbrugh (born 10 July 1996) is a South African cricketer. He made his List A debut on 19 October 2019, for Western Province in the 2019–20 CSA Provincial One-Day Challenge. He made his first-class debut on 24 October 2019, for Western Province in the 2019–20 CSA 3-Day Provincial Cup.

References

External links
 

1996 births
Living people
South African cricketers
Western Province cricketers
Cape Cobras cricketers
Cricketers from Cape Town